Unnau is an Ortsgemeinde – a community belonging to a Verbandsgemeinde – in the Westerwaldkreis in Rhineland-Palatinate, Germany.

Geography

The community lies in the Westerwald between Limburg and Siegen. Through the community flows the Große Nister. Unnau belongs to the Verbandsgemeinde of Bad Marienberg, a kind of collective municipality. Its seat is in the like-named town.

History
In 1000, Unnau had its first documentary mention.

In 1969 came the merger of the until then three autonomous communities of Unnau, Korb and Stangenrod into the new greater community of Unnau.

Politics

The municipal council is made up of 16 council members who were elected in a majority vote in a municipal election on 13 June 2004.

Economy and infrastructure

Transport
North of the community runs Bundesstraße 414, leading from Hohenroth to Hachenburg. The nearest Autobahn interchange is Haiger/Burbach on the A 45 (Dortmund–Hanau), some 24 km away. Unnau lies on the Oberwesterwaldbahn (railway) to Limburg and Au (Sieg). From there, the cities of Cologne, Koblenz, Frankfurt am Main and Wiesbaden may be reached directly. The nearest InterCityExpress stop is the railway station at Montabaur on the Cologne-Frankfurt high-speed rail line.

Established businesses
 Erwin Häbel GmbH – sign factory
 Hans-Jürgen Babst – Electrical installation

References

External links
 Unnau in the collective municipality’s Web pages 

Municipalities in Rhineland-Palatinate
Westerwaldkreis